Charles-Amable Lenoir (22 October 1860 – 1926) was a French painter. Like his mentor, William-Adolphe Bouguereau, he was an academic painter and painted realistic portraits as well as mythological and religious scenes. His artistic career was so prestigious that he won the Prix de Rome twice and was awarded the Légion d'honneur.

Biography

Lenoir was born in Châtellaillon, a small town just outside La Rochelle. His mother was a seamstress and his father was a customs officer. When he was young, his father was reassigned and the family moved to Fouras. He did not start out in life as an artist, but instead began his education at a teachers' college in La Rochelle. Upon graduation, he worked as a teacher and supervisor at the lycée in Rochefort.

In August 1883 he was accepted into the École des Beaux-Arts de Paris. He also joined the Académie Julian where he was a student of William-Adolphe Bouguereau and Tony Robert-Fleury. Lenoir made his artistic debut at the Salon in 1887 and continued to exhibit there until his death. He was quickly noticed in the art world, and in 1889 won the Second Prix de Rome for his painting, Jésus et le paralytique (Jesus and a Sick Man with Palsy), and he won the First Prix de Rome the following year for Le Reniement de Saint Pierre (The Denial of St. Peter).

His awards did not stop with the Prix de Rome; works shown at the Salons also won prizes, and he received a third-class medal in 1892 for Le Grenier a Vingt Ans (The Garret at twenty years) and a second-class medal in 1896 for La Mort de Sappho (The Death of Sappho). In 1900, he won a bronze medal at the world's fair in Paris for Le Calme (The Calm), a painting of his new wife, Eugénie Lucchesi.

In tribute to his lasting appeal, Lenoir was appointed a Chevalier de la Légion d'honneur in 1903. He kept a house in Fouras and returned every summer. He died there and was buried on 1 August 1926. In order to commemorate him, a monument was erected there in 1937 which stands to this day.

See also
 List of Orientalist artists
 Orientalism

Notes

References

Further reading

1860 births
1926 deaths
19th-century French painters
20th-century French painters
20th-century French male artists
Academic art
École des Beaux-Arts alumni
Chevaliers of the Légion d'honneur
French male painters
Orientalist painters
Prix de Rome for painting
19th-century French male artists